Odbert Herman Hamric (March 1, 1928 – August 8, 1984) was an American professional baseball player from 1949 to 1961. An outfielder in minor league baseball, the native of Clarksburg, West Virginia, appeared in ten Major League games as a pinch hitter: two games for the 1955 Brooklyn Dodgers and eight for the 1958 Baltimore Orioles.

He died at  age 56 in Springboro, Ohio.

External links

Venezuelan Professional Baseball League statistics

1928 births
1984 deaths
Baltimore Orioles players
Baseball players from West Virginia
Brooklyn Dodgers players
Cambridge Dodgers players
Chattanooga Lookouts players
Fort Worth Cats players
Indios de Oriente players
Leones del Caracas players
American expatriate baseball players in Venezuela
Los Angeles Angels (minor league) players
Miami Marlins (IL) players
Mobile Bears players
Montreal Royals players
Newport News Dodgers players
Portsmouth-Norfolk Tides players
St. Paul Saints (AA) players
Sportspeople from Clarksburg, West Virginia
Valdosta Dodgers players